Kenwood is an unincorporated community in northeastern Fayette County, Georgia. It uses the address of nearby Fayetteville, Georgia.

Nearby communities
The nearby communities are Fayetteville, Peachtree City and Tyrone, Georgia.

References

External links

Unincorporated communities in Fayette County, Georgia
Unincorporated communities in Georgia (U.S. state)